Christopher Grier (born March 24, 1970) is an American football executive who is the general manager of the Miami Dolphins of the National Football League (NFL), a position he has held since 2016. Having been with the organization since 2000, Grier held various scouting roles with increasing responsibility with the Dolphins. He also has past experience in the personnel department of the New England Patriots, having served there from 1994–1999.

Early years
Grier's father Bobby was the Associate Director of Pro Personnel for the Houston Texans of the National Football League (NFL) from 2000-2016. Prior to that, Bobby Grier spent several years with the New England Patriots, where he served in various roles, including as the running back coach, director of pro scouting, and vice-president of player personnel. Grier worked under his father with the Patriots until 1999, when the organization fired head coach Pete Carroll. His brother Mike is the current General Manager of the San Jose Sharks in the National Hockey League, and a former professional ice hockey player who played for the Edmonton Oilers, Washington Capitals, San Jose Sharks, and Buffalo Sabres.

Grier attended the University of Massachusetts Amherst, where he majored in journalism; while in college, he played football for two years and then spent his final two years as an undergraduate assistant.

Executive career

New England Patriots
Grier served as an intern for the New England Patriots in 1994 before being promoted to a regional scout in 1995. Grier's Patriots made the Super Bowl once in his tenure; in Super Bowl XXXI where the team lost to the Green Bay Packers 21-35. Grier has worked alongside head coaches Bill Parcells and Pete Carroll during his tenure in New England.

Miami Dolphins
From 2000 to 2002, Grier served as an area scout for the Miami Dolphins. In 2003, Grier was promoted to national scout and assistant director of college scouting. He held this position until 2007 when he was promoted to director of college scouting. In his first 15 years with the Dolphins (before becoming their general manager in 2016), Grier has worked alongside head coaches Dave Wannstedt, Nick Saban, Cam Cameron, Tony Sparano, and Joe Philbin.

On January 4, 2016, Grier was promoted to general manager of the Miami Dolphins. 5 days later, Chicago Bears offensive coordinator Adam Gase was hired as the new head coach of the Dolphins. In his first move as general manager, Grier traded the Dolphins' 2016 first round draft pick (8th overall), to the Philadelphia Eagles for linebacker Kiko Alonso, cornerback Byron Maxwell and the Eagles' first round draft pick (13th overall). The Eagles used the 8th overall pick in the 2016 draft to traded up with the Cleveland Browns for quarterback Carson Wentz. During Grier’s tenure, the Dolphins have had 3 winning seasons but have made the playoffs just once, in 2016, which was his first year as the GM. Despite the Dolphins' struggles for much of Grier's tenure, he has survived 3 head coaching changes (Adam Gase, Brian Flores, and Mike McDaniel).

On December 31, 2018, Grier dismissed 3rd-year head coach Adam Gase and demoted 4th-year vice president of football operations Mike Tannenbaum as part of many organizational changes the team made following the 2018 season. On February 4, 2019, a day after Super Bowl LIII, Grier hired long-time New England Patriots assistant Brian Flores as the team's new head coach.

On April 23, 2020, Grier drafted Alabama quarterback Tua Tagovailoa with the 5th pick in the 2020 draft, making Tagovailoa the highest drafted quarterback the team has selected since Bob Griese in 1967. A year later, on April 29, 2021, Grier drafted Tagovailoa's former teammate from Alabama, wide receiver Jaylen Waddle with the 6th pick and Miami linebacker Jaelan Phillips with the 18th pick in the 2021 draft. Grier's 2021 draft selections would turn out to be a success, as Jaylen Waddle would break Anquan Boldin's record of receptions caught by a rookie at the end of the season, and Jaelan Phillips would become the first rookie since Julius Peppers in 2002 to record at least 6 sacks in a 3 game span.

On January 10, 2022, Dolphins owner Stephen M. Ross fired 3rd-year head coach Brian Flores due to Flores having a bitter relationship with both the front office and roster, and decided to retain Grier for the 2022 season, becoming the franchise's longest-serving general manager since Eddie Jones, who managed the team from 1990-2004 and was the franchise's longest-serving GM.

References

1970 births
Living people
National Football League general managers
Miami Dolphins executives
University of Massachusetts Amherst College of Social and Behavioral Sciences alumni
African-American sports executives and administrators
American sports executives and administrators
People from Holliston, Massachusetts
Sportspeople from Middlesex County, Massachusetts
21st-century African-American sportspeople
20th-century African-American sportspeople